Babylon is a British comedy-drama television series co-created by Danny Boyle, Robert Jones, Jesse Armstrong and Sam Bain for Channel 4, and produced by Nightjack Ltd.

The series is set in London, and follows various characters working for the Metropolitan Police Service, police officers on the streets, who are responding to incidents, as well as the top management and PR department at New Scotland Yard, who try to counter any backlash from such incidents.

Plot
The series follows the new Director of Communications, the American Liz Garvey (Brit Marling), who has been headhunted by the Police Commissioner Richard Miller (James Nesbitt) to drag the force into the new media age, and her conflicts with her own department and legal bureaucracy. This is intercut with the happenings within a team in the Territorial Support Group and a team of authorised firearms officers in the Specialist Firearms Command.

Cast
 Brit Marling as Liz Garvey, Director of Communications
 James Nesbitt as Sir Richard Miller, Commissioner
 Bertie Carvel as Finn Kirkwood, Communications Deputy
 Ella Smith as Mia Conroy, Communications staff member
 Paterson Joseph as Charles Inglis, Assistant Commissioner, later Commissioner
 Jonny Sweet as Tom Oliver, Superintendent and Personal Aide to the Commissioner
 Nicola Walker as Sharon Franklin, Assistant Commissioner
 Jill Halfpenny as PC Davina Bancroft, TSG officer, married to SCO19 officer Banjo
 Cavan Clerkin as PC Damien "Clarkey" Clarke, TSG officer
 Owain Arthur as PC Paul "Nobbo" Norrington, TSG officer
 Adam Deacon as PC Robbie Vas, TSG officer who moves over to SCO19
 Andrew Brooke as PC Neil "Banjo" Bancroft, SCO19 officer, married to TSG officer Davina
 Stuart Martin as PC Tony Forbes, SCO19 officer
 Nick Blood as PC Warwick Collister, SCO19 officer
 Daniel Kaluuya as Matt Coward, documentary film maker
 Ralph Brown as Grant Delgado, Deputy Mayor of London

Production
Channel 4 originally announced that Babylon had been commissioned for Autumn 2014 on 23 December 2013. They further announced the six-part series had begun filming, in Liverpool and London on 17 April 2014.

Danny Boyle directed the pilot episode, while Jon S. Baird directed the first three episodes of Series 1 with Sally El Hosaini directing the last three.

Episode two was partly filmed at the Metropolitan Police Training Ground in Gravesend, Kent and features in the scenes where Robbie (Adam Deacon) trains at the firing range. Episode six, the series finale, recreated the London Riots of 2011.

In a 2015 interview with Radio Times magazine, Sam Bain stated that it was unlikely Babylon would return for a further series, with Jesse Armstrong explaining that "getting everyone back together seemed like it would be extraordinarily complicated, so we haven't pursued it".

Episodes

Pilot (2014)

Series 1 (2014)

Reception
Review aggregator Rotten Tomatoes gave the show a 75% "fresh" rating with an average rating of 7.2/10 based on 16 reviews. The critical consensus states: "Babylon successfully combines two genres into one show, adding great actors and timely subject matter to stealthy wit and hard-hitting drama." Metacritic, which uses a weighted average, assigned a score of 67 out of 100, based on 14 critics, indicating "generally favorable reviews".

International broadcast
Babylon premiered on SundanceTV in the United States on 8 January 2015. In Australia, the series premiered on 28 September 2015 on BBC First.

References

External links

Channel 4 original programming
2014 British television series debuts
2014 British television series endings
English-language television shows
Serial drama television series